To Be the Best is a 1991 British television miniseries directed by Tom Wharmby. Based on the 1988 novel by Barbara Taylor Bradford, it was the fourth mini-series based on a Bradford novel he had directed. It was produced by London Weekend Television in association with Antenne-2 and Gemmy Productions, and aired on ITV in the UK between 20 and 27 December 1991 in two parts, and on CBS in the U.S. on 2 and 4 August 1992.

Cast
 Lindsay Wagner as	Paula Harte
 Anthony Hopkins as Jack Figg
 Stephanie Beacham  as Arabella Sutton 
 Christopher Cazenove as Jonathan Ainsley
 Stuart Wilson as Jack Miller
 Fiona Fullerton as Madelena O'Shea
 Gary Cady as Philip Amory
 David Robb as Shane O'Neill
 Claire Oberman as Sarah Pascal
 Christopher Blake as Sandy Barkstone
 James Saito as Tony Chiu
 Thomas Ewbabk as Patrick
 Julian Fellowes as Dennis
 Rob Freeman as Harvey G. Rawson
 Rupert Bates as Burrows
 Belinda Mayne as Jill
 Robert Austin as George
 Kate Spiro as Pam
 Candy Lacy-Smith as Susan Sorrell
 Louis Roth as Elwyn Sorrell
 Moray Watson as Hunter
 Bill Reimbold as Peale
 Bill Hutchinson as Doone
 Sarah Lam as Ming
 Peter Dennis as Doctor

Release
The film originally aired in Britain on ITV in December 1991. In the United States, it aired on CBS in August 1992.

The series was subsequently released on VHS on 10 July 1995 and on 24 February 2003 by Odyssey Video. The complete series was released and repackaged on DVD in the United Kingdom by Acorn Media UK on 8 September 2008.

References

External links

To Be the Best at TCM

1991 British television series debuts
1991 British television series endings
1990s British drama television series
ITV television dramas
1990s British television miniseries
Television shows based on British novels
Television series by ITV Studios
London Weekend Television shows
English-language television shows
Television shows set in England
Television shows set in the United States
Television shows set in Hong Kong